Kenneth Charles Harman Warner (6 April 1891 – 18 March 1983) was Bishop of Edinburgh from 1947 to 1961.

Biography 
Warner was born on 6 April 1891 and educated at Tonbridge School and Trinity College, Oxford. His first career as a solicitor was interrupted by wartime service with the Army Cyclist Corps at the end of which he was awarded the DSO. Ordained after a period of study at Ripon College Cuddesdon in 1924, he began his career with a curacy at St George's Ramsgate. After this he was a chaplain in the Royal Air Force flying on active service in his fifties then Provost of St. Mary's Cathedral, Glasgow. In 1938 he became Archdeacon of Lincoln before his ordination to the episcopate. He died on 18 March 1983.

References

1891 births
People from Tonbridge
People educated at Tonbridge School
Alumni of Trinity College, Oxford
Companions of the Distinguished Service Order
Alumni of Ripon College Cuddesdon
Archdeacons of Lincoln
Provosts of St Mary's Cathedral, Glasgow
Bishops of Edinburgh
20th-century Scottish Episcopalian bishops
1983 deaths
Royal Air Force chaplains
World War II chaplains
Army Cyclist Corps officers
British Army personnel of World War I
Royal Air Force personnel of World War II